William or Bill Zimmerman may refer to: 
 William Carbys Zimmerman, American architect
 Bill Zimmerman (activist), American political consultant, author and anti-war activist
 Bill Zimmerman (baseball), American baseball player
 Will Zimmerman, a character in the Canadian television series Sanctuary